"One Slip" is a song from Pink Floyd's 1987 album A Momentary Lapse of Reason.

Composition
The album gets its title from a line of this song's lyrics. The song was co-written by David Gilmour and Roxy Music guitarist Phil Manzanera, who later co-produced Gilmour's On an Island album and played rhythm guitar on the subsequent tour.

Release
It was first released as the B-side to "Learning to Fly". It was then re-released as the third single from the album in the UK where it was a minor hit and was the fourth single from the album in the US where it did well on the Billboard Mainstream Rock Tracks chart.

"One Slip (2019 remix)" from the box set, The Later Years 1987–2019 was released as a single on 24 October 2019 on Spotify and 25 October 2019 on YouTube and iTunes. The song contains newly recorded drums by Nick Mason and organ parts by Richard Wright lifted from 1987-89 live performances, replacing the song's original drum and keyboard parts.

Live
The track was the final song from the album played live when it was the first encore on the Momentary Lapse of Reason tour from 1987–89. The band resurrected the track on one show on their 1994 The Division Bell tour when the band performed it in Oakland, California.

Video
The video for the track is footage of a vintage 1930s plane flying interspersed with concert clips filmed during the band's three night run at The Omni in Atlanta, Georgia. The live footage was shot in November 1987 and was directed by Lawrence Jordan (who has directed concert films for Rush, Mariah Carey and Billy Joel). Videos for "On the Turning Away" and "The Dogs of War" were also filmed from this concert.

Personnel
David Gilmour – guitars, vocals, sequencer
Nick Mason – percussion

Additional musicians:
Bob Ezrin – keyboards
Jon Carin – keyboards
Tony Levin – Chapman Stick
Jim Keltner – drums
Michael Landau – guitars (on the opening parts of "One Slip")
Darlene Koldenhoven – backing vocals
Carmen Twillie – backing vocals
Phyllis St. James – backing vocals
Donny Gerrard – backing vocals

 Oakland Stadium, California on 24 April 1994

David Gilmour – lead vocals, guitar
Nick Mason – drums
Richard Wright – keyboards

Additional musicians:
Guy Pratt – bass
Jon Carin – keyboards
Sam Brown – backing vocals
Durga McBroom – backing vocals
Claudia Fontaine – backing vocals
Tim Renwick – guitar
Gary Wallis – percussion

References

External links

Pink Floyd songs
1988 singles
Songs written by David Gilmour
Song recordings produced by Bob Ezrin
Song recordings produced by David Gilmour
Songs written by Phil Manzanera
1987 songs
EMI Records singles
Columbia Records singles